The South African Railways Class 6E1, Series 3 of 1971 was an electric locomotive.

Between 1971 and 1973, the South African Railways placed 150 Class 6E1,  electric locomotives with a Bo-Bo wheel arrangement in mainline service.

Manufacturer

The 3 kV DC Class 6E1, Series 3 electric locomotive was designed and built for the South African Railways (SAR) by Union Carriage & Wagon (UCW) in Nigel, Transvaal, with the electrical equipment being supplied by the General Electric Company (GEC).

One hundred and fifty units were delivered between 1971 and 1973, numbered in the range from E1296 to E1445. Like Series 1 and 2, Series 3 units were equipped with four AEI-283AZ axle-hung traction motors. UCW did not allocate builder’s numbers to the locomotives it built for the SAR and used the SAR unit numbers for their record keeping.

Characteristics

Orientation
These dual cab locomotives had a roof access ladder on one side only, just to the right of the cab access door. The roof access ladder end was marked as the no. 2 end. A corridor along the centre of the unit connected the cabs which were identical apart from the fact that the handbrake was located in cab 2. A pantograph hook stick was stowed in a tube mounted below the bottom edge of the locomotive body on the roof access ladder side. The units had one square and two rectangular access panels along the lower half of the body on the roof access ladder side, and only one square access panel on the opposite side.

Series identifying features

The Class 6E1 was produced in eleven series over a period of nearly sixteen years, with altogether 960 units placed in service, all built by UCW. While some Class 6E1 series were visually indistinguishable from their predecessors or successors, some externally visible changes did occur over the years.

The fifty Series 2 and the first fifty Series 3 units are visually indistinguishable from each other. On the Series 3 units in the number range from E1346 to E1445, an externally visible difference is a wider stirrup below their side doors.

This appears to indicate that Series 2 should actually have consisted of one hundred units and not fifty, firstly since unit numbers E1246 to E1345 are identical in exterior appearance and secondly since Series 4, 5 and 6 were all delivered in batches of one hundred. In addition, Series 2 and 3 used the same AEI-283AZ traction motors.

Service
The Class 6E1 family saw service all over both 3 kV DC mainline and branch line networks, the smaller Cape Western mainline between Cape Town and Beaufort West and the larger network which covers portions of the Northern Cape, the Free State, Natal, Gauteng, North West and Mpumalanga.

Reclassification and rebuilding

Reclassification to Class 16E
During 1990 and 1991, Spoornet semi-permanently coupled several pairs of otherwise largely unmodified Class 6E1 units, reclassified them to Class 16E and allocated a single locomotive number to each pair, with the individual units in the pairs inscribed "A" or "B". The aim was to accomplish savings on cab maintenance by coupling the units at their no. 1 ends, abandoning the no. 1 end cabs in terms of maintenance and using only the no. 2 end cabs.

One such pair was made up of two Series 3 units, numbers E1418 and E1419, which became Class 16E no. 16-227A and B respectively.

Rebuilding to Class 18E

Beginning in 2000, Spoornet began a project to rebuild Series 2 to 11 Class 6E1 units to Class 18E, Series 1 and Series 2 at the Transnet Rail Engineering workshops at Koedoespoort. In the process the cab at the no. 1 end was stripped of all controls and the driver's front and side windows were blanked off to have a toilet installed, thereby forfeiting the loco's bi-directional ability.

Since the driving cab's noise level had to be below 85 decibels, cab 2 was selected as the Class 18E driving cab primarily based on its lower noise level compared to cab 1, which is closer and more exposed to the compressor's noise and vibration. Another factor was the closer proximity of cab 2 to the low voltage switch panel. The fact that the handbrake was located in cab 2 was not a deciding factor, but was considered an additional benefit.

The known Class 6E1, Series 3 units which were used in this project, were all rebuilt to Class 18E, Series 2 locomotives. Their numbers and renumbering details are listed in the table.

Liveries
With five exceptions, the whole series was delivered in the SAR Gulf Red livery with signal red cowcatchers, yellow whiskers and with the number plates on the sides mounted on three-stripe yellow wings. In the 1990s many of the Series 3 units began to be repainted in the Spoornet orange livery with a yellow and blue chevron pattern on the cowcatchers. Several later received the Spoornet maroon livery. In the late 1990s at least two were repainted in the Spoornet blue livery with solid numbers and at least one in the Spoornet blue livery with outline numbers.

The five exceptions, numbers E1341 to E1345, were delivered in blue with yellow whiskers for use on the Blue Train between the Rand and Kimberley. In about 1985, these five were replaced by the five ex MetroBlitz Class 12E locomotives which were then all repainted in blue and whiskers. The five blue Series 3 locomotives were all eventually repainted in Spoornet’s orange livery.

In 2009 no. E1328 was withdrawn from road service and repainted in a white and dull green livery for use as apprentice trade test locomotive at Sentrarand.

Illustration

References

Bo-Bo locomotives
Cape gauge railway locomotives
2890
Railway locomotives introduced in 1971
Union Carriage & Wagon locomotives